The Anaheim Storm was a member of the National Lacrosse League. They played at the Arrowhead Pond, now the Honda Center, in Anaheim, California. They were the New Jersey Storm from the 2002 season to 2003. Starting for the 2004 season the team relocated to Anaheim, California. After the 2005 season, the Storm suspended operations due to low attendance.

The franchise was owned by NBA star Jayson Williams. Notable stars include Mark Shepherd, Casey and Ryan Powell.

All-time record

References

 
Defunct National Lacrosse League teams
Lacrosse clubs established in 2004
Sports clubs disestablished in 2005
Lacrosse teams in California
2004 establishments in California
2005 disestablishments in California
Sports in Anaheim, California